Mont-Tonnerre  was a department of the First French Republic and later the First French Empire in present-day Germany. It was named after the highest point in the Palatinate, the Donnersberg ("Thunder Mountain", possibly referring to Donar, god of thunder).  It was the southernmost of four departments formed in 1797 when the west bank of the Rhine was annexed by France. Prior to the French occupation, its territory was divided between the Archbishopric of Mainz, the Bishopric of Speyer, the Bishopric of Worms, Nassau-Weilburg, Hesse-Darmstadt, the Electorate of the Palatinate and the imperial cities of Worms and Speyer. Its territory is now part of the German states of Rhineland-Palatinate and Saarland. Its capital was Mainz.

The department was subdivided into the following arrondissements and cantons (situation in 1812):

 Mainz, cantons: Alzey, Bingen, Bechtheim, Kirchheimbolanden, Mainz (2 cantons), Nieder-Olm, Ober-Ingelheim, Oppenheim, Wöllstein and Wörrstadt. 
 Kaiserslautern, cantons: Göllheim, Kaiserslautern, Lauterecken, Obermoschel, Otterberg, Rockenhausen, Winnweiler and Wolfstein.
 Speyer, cantons: Dürkheim, Edenkoben, Frankenthal, Germersheim, Grünstadt, Mutterstadt, Neustadt, Pfeddersheim, Speyer and Worms. 
 Zweibrücken, cantons: Annweiler, Homburg, Landstuhl, Medelsheim, Neuhornbach, Pirmasens, Waldfischbach and Zweibrücken.

Its population in 1812 was 342,316.

After Napoleon was defeated in 1814, the department was divided between the Kingdom of Bavaria (Palatinate) and the Grand Duchy of Hesse (around Mainz).

References

Former departments of France in Germany
1798 establishments in France